The 2005 Stan James World Matchplay was the 12th staging of the major darts tournament by the Professional Darts Corporation (PDC). It was held at the Winter Gardens, Blackpool between 24th – 30th July 2005.

Colin Lloyd, the PDC world number one since April 2005, secured his second major televised title adding to his World Grand Prix title from the previous October. He beat John Part in the final, Part had earlier knocked out World Champion Phil Taylor in the quarter-finals which ended Taylor's successful run at Blackpool. Taylor had won the Matchplay title for five successive years. Taylor had also won the first four major titles of 2005 and was just two tournaments short of an incredible Grand Slam of televised PDC titles.

Lloyd had to overcome a tough quarter-final against rising star Adrian Lewis. Lewis, a qualifier and protégé of Phil Taylor, led 13–11 before Lloyd won five successive legs to clinch a place in the semi-final where he also came from behind from 3–7 to beat Ronnie Baxter 17–11.

The final saw Lloyd hit 15 maximum 180s and led all the way through the match although Part did manage to peg him back from 0–3 to 4–5 in the early stages. Lloyd stretched his lead to 12–6 and then took five out of six legs to go with one of victory. Although Part took three legs in a row, he was too far behind to stage a comeback and Lloyd checked out the highest possible finish of 170 to take the title in style.

Prize money

Seeds

Draw

World Matchplay (darts)
World Matchplay Darts